Fernando Gastón Elizari (born 5 April 1991) is an Argentine footballer who plays for Defensor Sporting as a midfielder.

Honours
San Lorenzo
Argentine Primera División: 2013 Inicial
Copa Libertadores: 2014

Johor Darul Takzim F.C.
Malaysia Super League : 2018

External links
 Elizari at Football Lineups
 

1991 births
Living people
Argentine footballers
Argentine expatriate footballers
Footballers from Buenos Aires
Club Atlético Independiente footballers
Quilmes Atlético Club footballers
San Lorenzo de Almagro footballers
O'Higgins F.C. footballers
Defensa y Justicia footballers
Johor Darul Ta'zim F.C. players
Dorados de Sinaloa footballers
Unión de Santa Fe footballers
C.A. Cerro players
Defensor Sporting players
Argentine Primera División players
Chilean Primera División players
Malaysia Super League players
Ascenso MX players
Association football midfielders
Argentine expatriate sportspeople in Chile
Argentine expatriate sportspeople in Malaysia
Argentine expatriate sportspeople in Mexico
Argentine expatriate sportspeople in Uruguay
Expatriate footballers in Chile
Expatriate footballers in Malaysia
Expatriate footballers in Mexico
Expatriate footballers in Uruguay